Volkovo is a rural locality (a selo) and the administrative center of Volkovsky Selsoviet of Blagoveshchensky District, Amur Oblast, Russia. The population was 2,075 as of 2018. There are 36 streets.

Geography 
Volkovo is located 23 km east of Blagoveshchensk (the district's administrative centre) by road. Rovnoye is the nearest rural locality.

References 

Rural localities in Blagoveshchensky District, Amur Oblast